The 2019 FC Zhetysu season was the club's second season back in the Kazakhstan Premier League following their relegation at the end of the 2016 season, and 22nd season in total. Zhetysu finished the season in 5th position, whilst being knockout out of the Kazakhstan Cup at the Last 16 stage by Atyrau.

Squad

Transfers

In

Out

Loans in

Released

Trial

Competitions

Premier League

Results summary

Results by round

Results

League table

Kazakhstan Cup

Squad statistics

Appearances and goals

|-
|colspan="14"|Players away from Zhetysu on loan:
|-
|colspan="14"|Players who left Zhetysu during the season:

|}

Goal scorers

Disciplinary record

References

FC Zhetysu seasons
Zhetysu